Gayt Dam is a dam in the eastern part of Turkey. The dam spans the Gayt River (Gayt Çayı), a right-bank tributary of the Eastern Euphrates (Murat River). The development was backed by the Turkish State Hydraulic Works.

See also
List of dams and reservoirs in Turkey

References
DSI directory, State Hydraulic Works (Turkey), Retrieved December 16, 2009

Dams in Bingöl Province